A Double Periodic Variable (DPV) is a type of binary star. As the name implies, the systems vary in brightness not only due to eclipses of one star by the other, but also on a cycle of roughly 33 times longer than the orbit. The star gaining mass from the other has a thick disk of material surrounding it, and the systems apparently lose mass cyclically into the interstellar medium over time. The cause for the secondary longer variability still is not established, but it has been proposed to be linked to a magnetic dynamo in the donor (mass transferring) star. A famous example is β Lyrae. The stars are rare, with 21 systems found in the Galaxy and more than 170 in the Magellanic Clouds (Abril 2016).

List
Catalogues of Double Periodic Variables are given by Mennickent, Otero and Kołaczkowski (2016), Pawlak et al. (2013) and Poleski et al. (2010). Some few examples are given below.
The following list contains selected double periodic variables that are of interest to amateur or professional astronomy. Unless otherwise noted, the given magnitudes are in the V-band.

References 
 Mennickent, R.E., 2017, Long Photometric Cycles in Hot Algols, Serbian Astronomical Journal 194, 1
Schleicher, D., Mennickent, R.E., 2017, A dynamo mechanism as the potential origin of the long cycle in double periodic variables, Astronomy and Astrophysics, 602, A109.
Mennickent, R.E., Otero, S., Kolaczkowski, Z., 2016, Interacting binaries W Serpentids and double periodic variables, Monthly Notices of the Royal Astronomical Society, Volume 455, Issue 2, p. 1728-1745.
 Otero, S.A., Watson, C., Wils, P., Variable Star Type Designations in the VSX. AAVSO Website. American Association of Variable Star Observers. Retrieved 11 May 2014.
 Pawlak, M., et al. 2013, Eclipsing Binary Stars in the OGLE-III Fields of the Small Magellanic Cloud, Acta Astronomica, vol 63, no 3, p. 323-338.
 Poleski, R. et al. 2010, The Optical Gravitational Lensing Experiment. The OGLE-III Catalog of Variable Stars. X. Enigmatic Class of Double Periodic Variables in the Large Magellanic Cloud, Acta Astronomica, vol 60, no 3, p. 179-196.
 Mennickent, R.E., Pietrzynski, G., Diaz, M, Gieren, W., 2003, Double-periodic blue variables in the Magellanic Clouds, Astronomy and Astrophysics, v.399, p. L47-L50. (Discovery paper).

Eclipsing binaries
Eruptive variables